The 1987 Lipton International Players Championships was a combined men's and women's tennis tournament played on outdoor hard courts. It was the 3rd edition of the Miami Masters and was part of the 1987 Nabisco Grand Prix and the 1987 Virginia Slims World Championship Series.  The tournament moved from the previous venue in Boca West, Florida and took place at the Tennis Center at Crandon Park in Key Biscayne, Florida in the United States from February 23 through March 9, 1987. Miloslav Mečíř and Steffi Graf won the singles titles.

Finals

Men's singles

 Miloslav Mečíř defeated  Ivan Lendl 7–5, 6–2, 7–5
 It was Mečíř's 3rd title of the year and the 8th of his career.

Women's singles
 Steffi Graf defeated  Chris Evert-Lloyd 6–1, 6–2
 It was Graf's 2nd title of the year and the 10th of her career.

Men's doubles

 Paul Annacone /  Christo van Rensburg defeated  Ken Flach /  Robert Seguso 6–2, 6–4, 6–4
 It was Annacone's 1st title of the year and the 8th of his career. It was van Rensburg's 1st title of the year and the 9th of his career. It was also the pair's 2nd victory in the doubles event, having won it at the inaugural tournament in 1985.

Women's doubles
 Martina Navratilova /  Pam Shriver defeated  Claudia Kohde-Kilsch /  Helena Suková 6–3, 7–6(8–6)
 It was Navratilova's 2nd title of the year and the 241st of her career. It was Shriver's 2nd title of the year and the 93rd of her career. It was Navrátilová's 3rd title at the event, having previously won the singles and doubles events – the latter with Gigi Fernández – at the inaugural tournament in 1985.

References

External links
 ATP tournament profile
 ITF tournament edition details (men)
 ITF tournament edition details (women)

 
Lipton International Players Championships
Miami Open (tennis)
Lipton International Players Championships
Lipton International Players Championships
Lipton International Players Championships
Lipton International Players Championships